Wang Lumin (born December 7, 1990) is a Chinese Greco-Roman wrestler. He competed in the men's Greco-Roman 59 kg event at the 2016 Summer Olympics, in which he was eliminated in the repechage by Arsen Eraliev.

References

External links
 

1990 births
Living people
Chinese male sport wrestlers
Olympic wrestlers of China
Wrestlers at the 2016 Summer Olympics
21st-century Chinese people